Sale Isaia Jr. (born June 13, 1972) is a former American football guard. He played college football at UCLA. He was originally signed as an undrafted free agent by the Cleveland Browns in 1995.

College career
Isaia attended UCLA and originally played on the defensive line his first three seasons before being moved to the offensive line.

Professional career
After going undrafted in the 1995 NFL draft, Isaia was signed by the Cleveland Browns. As a rookie, he did not appear in any games. In 1996, he appeared in nine games. In 1997, he injured his knee and was placed on injured reserve on August 18, 1997. However, he didn't appear in another game until 2000.

On April 1, 1999, Isaia signed with the Indianapolis Colts. On February 17, 2000, he was signed by the Oakland Raiders. He was released on August 27, 2000. Three days laters, he was signed by the New England Patriots. In 2000, he appeared in all 16 regular season games starting 14. On May 15, 2001, he was released by the Patriots.

Personal life
Isaia is of Samoan descent. His son Jacob is projected to be one of Hawaii's top prospects in the class of 2018.

References

1972 births
Living people
American sportspeople of Samoan descent
American football offensive guards
UCLA Bruins football players
Cleveland Browns players
Baltimore Ravens players
Indianapolis Colts players
Frankfurt Galaxy players
Oakland Raiders players
New England Patriots players
Players of American football from Honolulu
Sportspeople from Oceanside, California
Players of American football from California